Aidan McDonough (born November 6, 1999) is an American professional ice hockey left wing for the Vancouver Canucks of the National Hockey League (NHL). McDonough was drafted 195th overall by the Canucks in the 2019 NHL Entry Draft.

Playing career
McDonough began his collegiate career for the Northeastern Huskies during the 2019–20 season, where he recorded 11 goals and 16 assists in 31 games. In eight games in February, McDonough led Hockey East in scoring with seven goals and 11 points. His five power-play goals were the most in the nation and his six power-play points led the league. He was subsequently named the Hockey East Co-Player of the Month for the month of February. 

During the 2020–21 season, he recorded ten goals and ten assists in 21 games, in a season that was shortened due to the COVID-19 pandemic. He posted seven goals and four assists in the month of February, and recorded his first career hat-trick on February 12, 2021. He was subsequently named the Hockey East Co-Player of the Month for the month of February. Following the season he was awarded the Hockey East Three-Stars Award.

On June 10, 2021, he was named an assistant captain for the 2021–22 season. During his junior year he recorded 25 goals and 14 assists in 38 games. He led the Huskies in goals and ranked second in the NCAA, while his .66 goals per game ranked third in the NCAA. Following an outstanding season he was named to the All-Hockey East First Team and named an AHCA East First Team All-American.

On March 28, 2022, McDonough announced he would return to Northeastern for his senior year. In the 2022–23 season, McDonough was selected as team captain of the Huskies and completed his fourth season in leading led the team with 20 goals and 38 points through 34 games.

Having concluded his collegiate career, McDonough was promptly signed to a two-year, entry-level contract with the Vancouver Canucks on March 13, 2023.

Career statistics

Awards and honors

References

External links
 

1999 births
Living people
AHCA Division I men's ice hockey All-Americans
Cedar Rapids RoughRiders players
Ice hockey players from Massachusetts
Northeastern Huskies men's ice hockey players
People from Milton, Massachusetts
Vancouver Canucks draft picks